The 2020 MLS Re-Entry Draft took place on December 17, 2020 (Stage 1) and December 22, 2020 (Stage 2). All 27 Major League Soccer clubs were eligible to participate. The priority order for the MLS Re-Entry Draft was reverse order of playoff finish in 2020, taking into account their regular season finish. The 2021 expansion team, Austin FC, received the last overall selection.

Available to all teams in Stage 1 of the Re-Entry draft were:
 Clubs must exercise the option for, or extend a Bona Fide Offer to, all players selected in Stage One and may not select their own draft-eligible players. Players with option years left on their contract will automatically be added to the drafting club's roster.
 Should a player reject the Bona Fide Offer, the drafting club will hold the Right of First Refusal for that player in MLS.

Players who were not selected in Stage 1 of the Re-Entry Draft were made available in Stage 2. Clubs selecting players in Stage 2 were able to negotiate a new salary with the player. If a selected player was not under contract, the selecting club was required to make a genuine offer to the player within seven days subject to League Office approval.

Players who were unselected after Stage 2 were made available to any MLS club on a first-come, first-served basis.

Teams also had the option of passing on their selection.

Stage One
The first stage of the 2020 MLS Re-Entry Draft took place on December 17, 2020.Teams select in the reverse order of their finish during the 2020 season, taking into account playoff performance. Three players were selected in the first stage.

Round 1

Round 2

Stage One trades

Stage Two
The second stage of the 2020 MLS Re-Entry Draft took place on Tuesday, December 22, 2020.

Round 1

Round 2

After the Second Stage concluded, teams were allowed to select players who were on their own roster in 2020.

Round 3

References 

Major League Soccer drafts
Mls Re-entry Draft, 2020
MLS Re-Entry Draft